Parambarai is a 1996 Indian Tamil language drama film, directed by K. S. Ravikumar, starring Prabhu and Roja. The film was released on 15 January 1996, and did fairly well at the box-office.

Plot 

Paramasivam and his father are in feud for several years.

In the past, Paramasivam saw his mother murdered by Maragatham but his father thought that she died because of her illness. His father later married Maragatham. So Paramasivam left his father's house and lived with his grandmother.

Back to the present, Paramasivam falls in love with Paruvatham, sister of a ruthless landlord Kumarasamy who dislikes Paramasivam.Later Paramasivam marries Paruvatham to which Kumarasamy decides to revenge Paramasivam by marrying his half-sister Parimila,daughter of Maragatham.Maragatham who always greed of Paramasivam's fame among villagers and her daughter affection towards him decides to kill him by joining hands with Kumarasamy who asks an offer to marry her daughter which she accepts.Instead of Paramasivam, Kumarasamy's goons kills his grandmother for which he decides to kills him.Beside the failure of Paramasivam's murder Kumarasamy demands his marriage with Parimila to Maragatham who betrays him.Later a conflict happens between them where Kumarasamy won and order his goons to kill her with her husband and tries to rape  Parimila where Paramasivam enters and rescue all even Maragatham who killed his mother.The movie ends by reunion of Paramasivam with his father and forgiving Maragatham.

Cast 

Prabhu as Paramasivan
Roja as Paravatham
Manorama as Paramasivan's grandmother
Goundamani as Karappusamy
Vijayakumar as Paramasivan's father
Senthil as Kanayiram
Sindhu as Maragatham
B. H. Tharun Kumar as Kumarasamy
Jyothi Meena as Mangamma
Meera as Parimala
Master Mahendran as Young Paramasivan
Sabitha Anand as Vijayakumar's first wife

Soundtrack 
The music was composed by Deva, with lyrics by Kalidasan.

Reception 
The film was a major commercial success. Kalki criticised the film for missing Ravikumar's signature directing style.

References

External links 
 

1990s Tamil-language films
1996 drama films
1996 films
Films directed by K. S. Ravikumar
Indian drama films